Yakov Nikolayevich Fedorenko (26 March 1947) was a Soviet marshal and commander during World War II.

Life 
Yakov Fedorenko was born to a working-class family in Tsareborisovo. He died in Moscow on 26 March 1947.

Career 
In 1915, during World War I, he was drafted into the Russian Navy. He also participated in October Revolution.

He joined the Red Army in 1918. In the 1920s, he completed the Higher Artillery Command School, and commanded multiple battalions and regiments.

On 4 June 1940, he became the Lieutenant-General of the Tank Troops. On 1 January 1940, he became a Colonel-General of the Tank Troops. On 21 February 1944, he became Marshal of the Tank Troops.

Ranks 
 Kombrig, 26 November 1935.
 Komdiv, 4 November 1939.

References 

1896 births
1947 deaths
People from Kharkiv Oblast
People from Izyumsky Uyezd
Russian Social Democratic Labour Party members
Old Bolsheviks
Communist Party of the Soviet Union members
Second convocation members of the Soviet of Nationalities
Soviet Marshals of Tank Troops
Frunze Military Academy alumni
Russian military personnel of World War I
Soviet military personnel of the Russian Civil War
Soviet military personnel of World War II
Recipients of the Order of Lenin
Recipients of the Order of the Red Banner
Recipients of the Order of Kutuzov, 1st class
Recipients of the Order of Suvorov, 1st class